South Central Junior and & Senior High School is a public high school serving the students of Laconia and Elizabeth and the surrounding townships.

About
The school is built adjacent to South Central Elementary School, in south central Harrison County. The school had 432 students enrolled during the 2007–2008 school year. During the 2007–2008 school year the school is staffed by 25 teachers and 4 administrators. The school has a 96% graduation rate.

See also
 List of high schools in Indiana

References

External links
South Central Website
School Statistics

Public high schools in Indiana
Public middle schools in Indiana
Schools in Harrison County, Indiana